The 2015–16 Liga de Fútbol Profesional Boliviano season was the 39th season of LFPB.

Teams
The number of teams for 2014–15 remains the same. Universitario (P) was relegated to the Liga Nacional B. They were replaced by the 2014–15 Liga Nacional B champion Ciclón.

Torneo Apertura

Standings

Torneo Clausura

Standings

Aggregate table

Relegation

Relegation/promotion playoff

Petrolero remains at the season 2016–17 LFPB.

References

External links
 Official website of the LFPB 
 Official regulations 

2015
2015 in South American football leagues
2016 in South American football leagues
1